Hazel Miller is an American blues, pop and gospel singer. Originally from Kentucky, she has performed in the Denver, Colorado area since 1984.

Early life 
Miller was born in Louisville, Kentucky as one of seven children. She began singing professionally at the age of 15 and featured prominently in the Louisville music scene. She sang backup for Al Green, and opened for Mel Tormé and Lou Rawls. Her band was the first African American band to play regularly at the Louisville Hyatt Hotel.

Career 
In 1984, while relocating to Los Angeles with her two children, Miller's rental truck broke down in Denver, and she decided to stay. Since then, she has performed in Colorado and beyond. A review in the Rocky Mountain News called her ‘a force of nature’, and her voice has been called ‘stunning, moving and powerful.’ She played at the Red Rocks Park and Amphitheater near Denver, at the White House for then President Bill Clinton, and for the Denver Broncos after their 1998 Super Bowl win. Miller has toured with the military five times, including playing at Iwo Jima. She has been a regular performer on the ETown Radio Show, airing on NPR's national affiliate stations. Her recorded voice greets visitors taking the trains to the main terminal at Denver International Airport.

In 2008 she launched Hazel Miller Entertainment and became a booking agent. She has sung with or opened for Julian Lennon, Peter, Paul & Mary, Charlie Musselwhite, James Taylor, James Brown, the Temptations, and many  others. In addition, she toured for five years with Big Head Todd and the Monsters, and has performed at major jazz and music festivals throughout Colorado.

Discography 
Albums

 1995: Hazel Miller and the Caucasians (Live at the Fox)
 2001: I'm Still Looking (USA 1 Stop label)
 2001: Live at the Fox (Hapi Skratch Records label)
 2006: Icons (Hazel Miller label)

Contributions

 1995: KBCO Studio C Vol. 5
 2004: KBCO Studio C Local Edition 
 2014 Blues Master 3

Awards 

 1995, 1996, 1997: Westwood Readers Poll Best Blues/R&B band
 2002: National Independent Music Award for Best Independent Blues-R&B Recording
 2008: Recognized as one of the 150 people who make Denver a better place to live
 Local award for "Best Local Star in a Theatrical Production", for her appearance in a Colorado production of The Vagina Monologues

References 

American women jazz singers
American jazz singers
Musicians from Louisville, Kentucky
Musicians from Denver
Living people
Year of birth missing (living people)
21st-century American women